Pigeon Mountain may refer to:
Pigeon Mountain (New Zealand)
Pigeon Mountain (Alberta), a mountain in Seebe, Alberta, Canada
Pigeon Mountain (Georgia), a mountain in Walker County

See also
Pigeon Peak, Colorado, United States